The Marine Protector class is a class of coastal patrol boats of the United States Coast Guard. 
The 87-foot-long vessels are based on the Stan 2600 design by Damen Group, and were built by Bollinger Shipyards of Lockport, Louisiana. Each boat is named after sea creatures which fly or swim

The Coast Guard placed its original order in 1999 for 50 boats, which were delivered by mid-2002. 
Several additional orders brought the class to a total of 74 ships, with the last, being completed in October 2009.
Four additional vessels were built for Foreign Military Sales, with two each going to Malta and Yemen. 

In May 2021, The United States announced that it would be sending three ships to the Lebanese Navy

The Marine Protector class replaced the 82-foot . These older boats had one small and one large berthing area, and they had to stop for five or more minutes to deploy or retrieve their pursuit inflatable boat via a small crane. The last Point-class cutter was decommissioned in 2003.

In 2020 the Department of Homeland Security proposed a budget for the Coast Guard for 2021 where 8 Marine Protector cutters would be decommissioned, as their missions could be taken by new Sentinel class cutters.

General characteristics

Missions include combating drug smuggling, illegal immigration, marine fisheries enforcement and search and rescue support. Since the September 11, 2001 attacks many have a homeland security mission in the form of ports waterways and coastal security (PWCS) patrols.

Boarding parties can be launched while the vessel is underway, through the cutter's stern launching ramp. The attached rigid hull inflatable boat (RHIB) has been upgraded since the initial inception of this class of cutter, in an effort to increase speed and sea state sustainability for boarding parties and rescue and assistance teams. The stern launching system requires just a single crewmember to remain on deck to launch or retrieve the boarding party.  

Their high-speed pursuit boat uses the same diesel fuel as the cutters.

Like all new U.S. Coast Guard vessels, the Marine Protector class are designed to accommodate crews of mixed gender with five separate small berthing spaces accommodating standard crews of ten with maximum berthing for 12.

Boats in class

References

External links
Globalsecurity.org - WPB 87' Marine Protector Class
U.S. Coast Guard: 87-foot Coastal Patrol Boat (WPB) - Marine Protector Class

 
Patrol vessels of the United States